Philotermes pilosus is a species of rove beetle in the family Staphylinidae. It is found in North America.

References

Further reading

 

Aleocharinae
Articles created by Qbugbot
Beetles described in 1857